Son Jeong-Tak (born May 3, 1976; Hanja:孫禎鐸) is a South Korean football player who was play at forward for Changwon City FC at National League in South Korea.

Career
 1999~2001 Ulsan Hyundai Horang-i
 2002~2003 Gwangju Sangmu Bulsajo (For military duty)
 2004~2005 Jeonbuk Hyundai Motors
 2005~2006 Suwon Samsung Bluewings
 2007 Changwon City FC

References
These references may be in Korean language

External links 
 

1984 births
Living people
Association football forwards
South Korean footballers
Ulsan Hyundai FC players
Gimcheon Sangmu FC players
Jeonbuk Hyundai Motors players
Suwon Samsung Bluewings players
Changwon City FC players
K League 1 players
Korea National League players